Cassandra Danielle Rohan (born February 28, 1998) is an American professional soccer player who plays as a midfielder for National Women's Soccer League (NWSL) club Chicago Red Stars.

Club career

Chicago Red Stars
Rohan made her NWSL debut in the 2020 NWSL Challenge Cup on July 1, 2020.

References

External links
 Drake profile

1998 births
Living people
American women's soccer players
Soccer players from Illinois
People from Palatine, Illinois
Women's association football midfielders
Drake Bulldogs women's soccer players
Chicago Red Stars players
American sportspeople of Mexican descent
National Women's Soccer League players